This is a list of films produced by the Tollywood (Telugu language film industry) based in Hyderabad in the year 1991.

1991

Highest Grossing Films

Dubbed films

References

1991
Telugu
 Telugu films
1991 in Indian cinema